Colors is a "word jazz" album by voice-over and recording artist Ken Nordine. It was commissioned by the Fuller Paint Company to write radio advertisement spots, but after a few commercials became popular, it evolved to become an album of 34 songs. Each track personifies a different color or hue.

Track listing
All songs composed by Dick Campbell / Ken Nordine.

 "Olive"
 "Lavender"
 "Burgundy"
 "Yellow"
 "Green"
 "Beige"
 "Maroon"
 "Ecru"
 "Chartreuse"
 "Turquoise"
 "White"
 "Flesh"
 "Azure"
 "Puce"
 "Magenta"
 "Orange"
 "Purple"
 "Muddy"
 "Russet"
 "Amber"
 "Blue"
 "Black"
 "Gold"
 "Crimson"
 "Brown"
 "Rosey"
 "Hazel"
 "Mauve"
 "Fuschia"
 "Sepia"
 "Nutria"
 "Cerise"
 "Grey"
 "Coral"

References

Ken Nordine albums
1966 albums
Concept albums